The Finally LP is a compilation album by Mark Kozelek. The CD was released on December 9, 2008 via Caldo Verde Records. From the press release:

The compilation includes a country-tinged version of "Lazy" by Low, "Bedtime Lullaby," which first appeared in an animated featurette on an episode of the children's show Yo Gabba Gabba! (season 1/episode 5), and an acoustic version of Stephen Sondheim's "Send in the Clowns" recorded for the Minneapolis Bridge Disaster benefit CD. The album also includes radio show rarities, a previously unreleased version of Hüsker Dü's "Celebrated Summer" and two previously unreleased instrumentals, "The Piano Song" and "Gaping Mouth."

The Finally LP was released on 12" vinyl in October 2009, and features two exclusive bonus tracks: a cover of "Indian Summer" (originally by The Doors) and a live version of "Send in the Clowns."

Track listing
 "Piano Song" (Kozelek) – 1:44
 "Finally" (Kath Bloom) – 2:11
 "New Partner" (Will Oldham) – 3:34
 "Send in the Clowns" (Stephen Sondheim) – 2:55
 "Lazy" (Alan Sparhawk, Mimi Parker, Zak Sally) – 3:30
 "Bedtime Lullaby" (Jarond Gibbs) – 1:31
 "Celebrated Summer" (Bob Mould) – 3:37
 "My Friend Bob" (Dom Leone) – 2:59
 "If You Want Blood" (Live in Lisbon) (Bon Scott, Angus Young, Malcolm Young) – 3:11
 "Gaping Mouth" (Kozelek) – 5:12

Vinyl-only bonus track
 "Indian Summer" (Jim Morrison)
 "Send in the Clowns" (Live) (Stephen Sondheim)

Credits
 Mark Kozelek - vocals, guitar, producer
 Anthony Koutsos - percussion
 Dylan Magierek - engineer
 Aaron Prellwitz - engineer, mastering
 Nyree Watts - photography
 David Rager - design

References

Mark Kozelek albums
2008 compilation albums
Caldo Verde Records albums
Albums produced by Mark Kozelek
Covers albums